Veronika "Vroni" Swidrak (born 12 December 1971) is an Austrian ski mountaineer.

Swidrak started ski mountaineering in the police skirally team in 1996 and competed first in the Rally del Pizzo Scalino in the same year. She has been member of the ASKIMO national team since 2008 and lives in Radfeld.

Selected results 
 2006:
 1st, Austrian Championship
 1st, Tyrolian Championship
 2008:
 6th, World Championship long distance race
 2010:
 3rd, World Championship relay race (together with Lydia Prugger and Michaela Eßl)
 3rd, Mountain Attack tour
 2011:
 6th, World Championship relay (together with Michaela Eßl and Lydia Prugger)
 9th, World Championship sprint
 2nd, Mountain Attack
 2012:
 5th, European Championship sprint
 5th, European Championship relay, together with Michaela Eßl and Ina Forchthammer
 7th, European Championship single
 9th, European Championship vertical race
 9th, World Championship vertical, combined ranking

Trofeo Mezzalama 

 2009: 4th, together with Maria Strasser and Klaudia Tasz

Patrouille des Glaciers 

 2010: 4th, (and 3rd in the "international civilian women" ranking), together with Lydia Prugger and Michaela Eßl

Pierra Menta 

 2011: 7th, together with Nina Cook Silitch

External links 
 Veronika Swidrak, skimountaineering.org
 Veronika Swidrak , ASKIMO

References 

1971 births
Living people
Austrian female ski mountaineers
21st-century Austrian women